Camille W. Zeckwer (June 26, 1875–August 7, 1924)  was an American composer.

Biography
Son of Richard Zeckwer, he was born in Philadelphia, and was educated at that city's Musical Academy.  Further study followed with Antonín Dvořák in New York City before he traveled to Berlin to study with Xavier Scharwenka. He then returned to Philadelphia, becoming an instructor at the Academy; with Frederick E. Hahn, he served as its co-director for a number of years.  As a composer Zeckwer was active mainly in smaller forms, producing many songs and chamber pieces; in larger forms he composed a symphonic poem, a piano concerto, an opera, and numerous cantatas.

References

External links

1875 births
1924 deaths
American male composers
American composers
American music educators
Musicians from Philadelphia
University of the Arts (Philadelphia) alumni
University of the Arts (Philadelphia) faculty